Burmese amber is fossil resin dating to the early Late Cretaceous Cenomanian age recovered from deposits in the Hukawng Valley of northern Myanmar. It is known for being one of the most diverse Cretaceous age amber paleobiotas, containing rich arthropod fossils, along with uncommon vertebrate fossils and even rare marine inclusions. A mostly complete list of all taxa described up until 2018 can be found in Ross 2018; its supplement Ross 2019b covers most of 2019.

Clade Amphiesmenoptera

Lepidoptera

Lepidopteran research
Description of new specimens of caterpillars expanding the morphological diversity of Cretaceous caterpillars, is published by Gauweiler et al. (2022), who also attempt to determine whether Cretaceous caterpillars might have represented an adequate food source for early birds.

Tarachoptera

Trichoptera

Clade Antliophora

Diptera

Mecoptera

Clade  Archaeorthoptera

Orthoptera

Other archaeorthopterans

Clade  Coleopterida

Coleoptera

Strepsiptera

Clade  Dictyoptera

Blattodea

Mantodea

Clade Hymenopteroida

Hymenoptera

Clade  Neuropterida

Megaloptera

Neuroptera

Raphidioptera

other neuropterida

Clade  Paraneoptera

Hemiptera

Permopsocida

Psocodea

Thysanoptera

Zoraptera

Clade  Perlidea

Dermaptera

Embioptera

Grylloblattodea

Phasmatodea

Plecoptera

Clade Palaeoptera

Ephemeroptera

Odonatoptera

Archaeognatha

Zygentoma

References

 
Prehistoric fauna by locality